Pristimantis incanus is a species of frog in the family Strabomantidae.
It is endemic to Ecuador.
Its natural habitats are tropical moist montane forests and rivers.
It is threatened by habitat loss.

References

incanus
Amphibians of Ecuador
Endemic fauna of Ecuador
Amphibians described in 1980
Taxonomy articles created by Polbot